This is a timeline documenting the events of heavy metal music in the year 1998.

Newly Formed bands

8 Foot Sativa
 40 Below Summer
Aarni
Abdullah
All That Remains 
Antagonist
 Arma Angelus
Ásmegin
At Vance
 Atreyu
Axenstar
Azarath
Baptism
Benighted
 Betzefer
Black Label Society
Blood Red Throne
Bloodbath
 Bullet for My Valentine (As Jeff Killed John)
Calico System
Cataract
 Chimaira
Circle of Dead Children
CKY 
Clandestine Blaze
 Cog
 Crucified Barbara
Cult of Luna
Dalriada 
Darkane
Deathspell Omega
Demons & Wizards 
Edenbridge  
Ephel Duath  
Every Time I Die  
Fair to Midland  
Fairyland   
Fantômas 
Firewind 
 Freedom Call
 From Zero
Full Scale (as Full Scale Deflection)
Gordian Knot
High on Fire
Hopesfall
Horse the Band
Ill Niño
Leviathan 
Lock Up 
Lunatica
Maximum the Hormone 
The Meads of Asphodel
Mnemic 
Noumena  
 Odd Crew  (As Kaskadiori)
 Peccatum
 Pressure 4-5
 Ram-Zet
 Rebaelliun
 Reveille
Ritual Carnage
 Rob Zombie
Shape of Despair
 Skindred
Stormwarrior
Sunn O)))
Susperia
 The Project  MCMXCIX
Thy Catafalque
Twilightning
 Týr
 Underoath
 Unearth
Unida
Vision Divine
Watain
Weakling
 Winds
Wormed
Wyrd 
Zyklon

Reformed bands
 Metal Church

Albums 

 Agathodaimon- Blacken The Angel
 Alabama Thunderpussy – Rise Again
 Altar - Provoke
 Amon Amarth - Once Sent from the Golden Hall
 Arghoslent - Galloping Through The Battle Ruins
 Anathema – Alternative 4
 Angelcorpse - Exterminate
 Angra – Fireworks
 Anthrax – Volume 8: The Threat Is Real
 Apocalyptica – Inquisition Symphony
 Arch Enemy – Stigmata
 Atreyu – Visions (EP)
 Ayreon – Into the Electric Castle
 Sebastian Bach – Bring em Bach Alive
 Backyard Babies – Total 13
 Behemoth - Pandemonic Incantations
 Benediction - Grind Bastard
 Bestial Warlust - Satan's Fist
 Black Label Society – Sonic Brew
 Black Sabbath – Reunion (live)
 Blind Guardian – Nightfall in Middle-Earth
 Bolt Thrower – Mercenary
 Borknagar – The Archaic Course
 Botch – American Nervoso
 Bruce Dickinson – The Chemical Wedding
 Cannibal Corpse – Gallery of Suicide
 Jerry Cantrell – Boogy Depot
 Candlemass – Dactylis Glomerata
 Cathedral - Caravan Beyond Redemption
 Catch 22 – Keasbey Nights
 Children of Bodom – Something Wild (Worldwide release)
 Clutch - The Elephant Riders
 Converge – When Forever Comes Crashing
Covenant - Nexus Polaris
 Cradle of Filth – Cruelty and the Beast
 Crowbar – Odd Fellows Rest
 Cryptopsy - Whisper Supremacy
 Dark Funeral - Vobiscum Satanas
 Dawn - Slaughtersun (Crown of the Triarchy)
 Death – The Sound of Perseverance
 Deep Purple – Abandon
 Destruction – The Least Successful Human Cannonball
 Devin Townsend – Christeen + 4 Demos (EP)
 Devin Townsend – Infinity
 The Dillinger Escape Plan – Under the Running Board (EP)
 Dimmu Borgir – Godless Savage Garden (compilation)
 Dream Theater – Once in a LIVEtime (live)
 Dying Fetus - Killing on Adrenaline
 Earth Crisis – Breed the Killers
 Edguy – Vain Glory Opera
 Enslaved - Blodhemn
 Eldritch – El Niño
 Exhumed - Gore Metal
 Far – Water & Solutions
 Fear Factory – Obsolete
 Firehouse – Category 5
 Freak Kitchen – Freak Kitchen
 The Gathering – How to Measure a Planet?
 Genitorturers - Sin City
 Godsmack – Godsmack
 Gorgoroth - Destroyer – or About How to Philosophize with the Hammer
 Gorguts - Obscura
 Grave Digger - Knights of the Cross
 HammerFall – Legacy of Kings
 Helloween – Better Than Raw
 Iced Earth – Something Wicked This Way Comes
 Incantation - Diabolical Conquest
 Iron Maiden – Virtual XI
 Jag Panzer – The Age of Mastery
 Kamelot – Siége Perilous
 Kataklysm - Victims of this Fallen World
 Katatonia – Discouraged Ones
 Kid Rock – Devil Without a Cause
 King Diamond – Voodoo
 KISS – Psycho Circus
 Korn – Follow the Leader
 Krabathor - Orthodox
 Krisiun – Apocalyptic Revelation
 L.A. Guns – Wasted
 David Lee Roth – DLR Band
 Madball – Look My Way
 Malevolent Creation - The Fine Art of Murder
 Yngwie Malmsteen – Concerto Suite for Electric Guitar and Orchestra in Em, Opus 1
 Yngwie Malmsteen – Double Live! (live)
 Marduk – Nightwing
 Mercenary – First Breath
 Mercyful Fate - Dead Again
 Meshuggah – Chaosphere
 Metal Church – Live (live)
 Metallica – Garage Inc. (compilation)
 Mindrot - Soul
 Marilyn Manson – Mechanical Animals
 Monster Magnet – Powertrip
 Moonspell – Sin/Pecado
 Morbid Angel – Formulas Fatal to the Flesh
 Mortician - Zombie Apocalypse (EP)
 Mortification - Triumph of Mercy
 Mötley Crüe – Greatest Hits (compilation)
 Motörhead – Snake Bite Love
 My Dying Bride – 34.788%... Complete
 Napalm Death - Words from the Exit Wound
 Nembrionic - Incomplete
 Nightwish – Oceanborn
 Night in Gales - Thunderbeast
 Nile – Amongst the Catacombs of Nephren-Ka
 Nothingface – An Audio Guide to Everyday Atrocity
 Old Man's Child – Ill-Natured Spiritual Invasion
 One Minute Silence – Available in All Colours
 Oomph! – Unrein
 Opeth – My Arms, Your Hearse
 Orange Goblin – Time Travelling Blues
 Orgy – Candyass
 Pig Destroyer – Explosions in Ward 6
 Pitchshifter – www.pitchshifter.com
 Pretty Boy Floyd – A Tale of Sex, Designer Drugs and The Death of Rock N Roll
 Primal Fear – Primal Fear
 Pro-Pain – Pro-Pain
 Queens of the Stone Age – Queens of the Stone Age
 Rage – XIII
 Refused – The Shape of Punk to Come
 Rhapsody – Symphony of Enchanted Lands
 Rob Zombie – Hellbilly Deluxe
 Rotting - Crushed
 Running Wild - The Rivalry 
 Rush – Different Stages (live)
 Samael - Exodus (EP)
 Savatage – The Wake of Magellan (in United States)
 Sentenced – Frozen
 Septicflesh - A Fallen Temple
 Sepultura – Against
 Sinister - Aggressive Measures
 Skepticism - Lead and Aether
 Skid Row – 40 Seasons: The Best of Skid Row (compilation)
 Slayer – Diabolus in Musica 
 Soilent Green - A String of Lies (EP)
 Soilent Green - Sewn Mouth Secrets
 Soilwork - Steelbath Suicide
 Soulburn - Feeding on Angels
 Soulfly – Soulfly
 Strapping Young Lad – No Sleep 'till Bedtime: Live in Australia (live)
 Stratovarius – Visions of Europe (live)
 Stratovarius – Destiny
 Stuck Mojo – Rising
 Dan Swanö - Moontower
 Symphony X – Twilight in Olympus
 System of a Down – System of a Down
 Tankard – Disco Destroyer
 The Sins of Thy Beloved – Lake of Sorrow
 Theatre of Tragedy – Aégis
 Therapy? – Semi-Detached
 Therion - Vovin
 Trail of Tears – Disclosure in Red
 Tristania – Widow's Weeds
 Turbonegro – Apocalypse Dudes
 2wo – Voyeurs
 Union – Union
 Ugly Kid Joe – The Very Best-As Ugly As It Gets
 Unsane – Occupational Hazard
 Vader – Kingdom (EP)
 Van Halen – Van Halen III
 Vintersorg – Hedniskhjärtad (EP)
 Vintersorg – Till fjälls
 Virgin Black – Trance (EP)
 Virgin Steele – Invictus
 Vision of Disorder – Imprint

Disbandments 
 24-7 Spyz
 Destruction (reformed in 1999)
 Faith No More (reformed in 2009)
 Handsome
 Helmet (reformed in 2004)
 Snot (reformed in 2008)
 Vulcain

Events 
 Aerosmith becomes the first rock band to debut at #1 on the Billboard Hot 100 with the single "I Don't Want to Miss a Thing"
 Mustis joins Dimmu Borgir on keyboards.
 Rob Halford of Judas Priest announces his homosexuality in an MTV interview.
 Hideto "hide" Matsumoto, guitarist of the Japanese band X Japan, commits suicide at the age of 33.
 Poison singer Bret Michaels directs and stars in the film A Letter from Death Row.

1990s in heavy metal music
Metal